World Series of Fighting Canada 1: Ford vs. Powell was a mixed martial arts event held  in Edmonton, Alberta, Canada.

Background

Headlining the card is top Canadian welterweight prospect Ryan "The Real Deal" Ford taking on Joel Powell for the inaugural WSOF Canadian welterweight champion. Undefeated heavyweight Steve Mocco takes on Smealinho Rama in the co-main event. 

Ultimate Fighter alum Michael Hill takes on Ryan Dickson. Former UFC vet Tim Hague is featured to be on the undercard taking on Lee Mein, the father of current UFC Welterweight fighter Jordan Mein.

Results

Bonus awards

The following fighters were awarded fight night bonuses:

 Fight of The Night: Ryan Dickson vs Michael Hill 
 Knockout of The Night: Ryan Ford 
 Submission of the Night: Brandt Dewsbery

See also 
 World Series of Fighting
 List of WSOF champions
 List of WSOF events

References

Events in Edmonton
World Series of Fighting events
2014 in mixed martial arts